"Enjoy Enjaami" is a Tamil-language song recorded by singer Dhee featuring Indian rapper Arivu and Indian producer Santhosh Narayanan. It is written and sung by lyricist  Arivu, Dhee debut single, composed and arranged by Narayanan under the music label/management Maajja, an independent platform launched by Indian producer A. R. Rahman. The song was released on 7 March 2021.

"Enjoy Enjaami" is a pop and hip hop song incorporating elements of R&B and oppari, a folk music style of Tamil Nadu. Its lyrics discuss civilizations and natural resources, inspired by events of colonial India, and is a homage to Tamil culture and people. The song was met with viral commercial success and widespread acclaim. Music critics praised the song's production, lyricism and the duo's vocals.

Its music video was released on YouTube on 10 March 2021. The video has gained more than 4.8 million likes and 449 million views (as of December 2022), becoming the first Tamil independent single to do so. The video was lauded for its themes and design. A remixed version of this song performed by DJ Snake along with Dhee, was released exclusively through Spotify on 21 June 2021, as a part of Spotify Singles initiative. "Enjoy Enjaami" has been regarded as the indicator to the advent of Tamil indie music.

Background 
According to the lyricist, Arivu, the song was written as a celebration of his roots, harkening back to a time when humanity was a fledgling civilisation, living in harmony with the turns of the earth and the many lives that shared it with them. His inspiration came from several places.

Both, Dhee and Arivu had discussed while working on Manikandan's Kadaisi Vivasayi. Arivu, who has been writing songs for The Casteless Collective, a political folk band, stated that: "They [the songs] are filled with anger which is not something that people would listen to. But, we do it knowing that it’s not a commercial space; Athu Makkalukaana Kural (The People's Voice)." However, he wanted the song to reach everyone and yet to have a political depth to it, which is according to Arivu, the idea — ulagam naaikum, narikum, punaikum, elikum, pooranukum sontham dhan (The world is for all the living beings) — came up. The team also stated that the song is inspired by Pa. Ranjith's work for his band Casteless Collective.

The song is the story of Valliammal, Arivu's grandmother, who used to call him 'Enjaami' (My Lord). It was the story told to him by his grandmother about the Tamil migration to Ceylon during the Colonial era. During the period of Colonial India, with a poverty-stricken population, it was a market for cheap labour. Hordes of Tamil people were sent to Ceylon in the 19th century to work on the tea, coffee and rubber plantations, with his grandmother being one of them. This inspired Arivu's lyrics which alluded to humanity's relationship to the Earth, with reference to the land, soil, and ancestors. Valliammal makes an appearance at the end of the music video, sat on a throne-esque seat, flanked by Arivu and Dhee to her left and right. Through this song, Arivu hoped to convey the forgotten roots of the Earth and the roots of self as a people. V Vivek of Deccan Herald stated that the song is a tribute to the Tamil plantation house and its workers.

The songwriting, production, recording and the accompanying music video shoot took place within 30 hours.

Music video 
The music video was directed by Amith Krishnan, who previously helmed many independent singles. Balaji Subramanyan filmed the visuals which took place in Arivu's hometown in Tiruvannamalai district. It was the first time Dhee has been on a music video for a performance of hers.

The music video opens with Parai drummers drumming along with women ululating, causing the Earth to shake. The video then cuts to a shot of Dhee uncovering her face, flanked by beautiful dancers all around her. The video mainly alternated between shots of Dhee and/or Arivu in a jungle-like set and in a dry field during the day and night, with the latter night scene being depicted as a celebratory bonfire party scene. Dhee is consistently depicted sitting on and standing beside a throne throughout the video and the video ends with Valliammal on a throne-like seat, alluding to Arivu's lyrics of celebrating a matriarchal society.

Release 

"Enjoy Enjaami" is the first Tamil-language single to be released under Maajja. Arivu stated that the theme of the song the main reason behind the team's decision to release the single first. The song was released as a single through various music streaming platforms (Spotify, Jiosaavn, Gaana, Apple Music, iTunes, Amazon Music, Hungama, Raaga.com) on 7 March 2021. The same day, both Dhee and Arivu performed the song through the reality show Super Singer telecasted on Star Vijay. On 10 March 2021, the music video for the song was released through YouTube.

Reception

Audience response 
The song and its music video received viral response for the picturisation, visuals, direction and for its lyrics and tunes which was touted to be a "fun and inspiring number". Many internet memes praising the song were circulated through social media. It was widely praised by celebrities from the Tamil film industry including Dhanush, Sai Pallavi, Siddharth, Samantha, Vignesh Shivan, Dulquer Salmaan, Lokesh Kanagaraj, Pa. Ranjith, Selvaraghavan and also by the Indian Cricketer Ravichandran Ashwin. The composer Santhosh Narayanan praised the audience for their unconditional support towards the song. Dairy brand Amul recreated a poster featuring Dhee and Arivu with their mascots and also referred a pun to its lead singer Dhee, celebrating the song. To raise awareness about COVID-19, Chennai Railway Police performed to the song at Chennai Central Railway Station.

Critical review 
Writing for The Hindu, Chennai-based critic Kavitha Muralidharan stated that "the song packs a punch with its vibrant frames and lyrics", further adding that "the timeless attachment to land, environment issues, the pain of the landless labourers and the love of nature, gives this seemingly easy earworm of a song both its depth and its rich character". A reviewer from The Indian Express called that the song "celebrates our shared existence with nature". Prathyush Parasuraman of Film Companion South stat that the song has "a kind of narrative storytelling, similar to Tamil’s Sangam Thinai poetry, where character and thus feeling is reflected in and thus subservient to nature and the landscape". Revathi Krishnan of ThePrint had called the song "talking about the feudal system, landless farmers and the caste system" had made people move over "Why This Kolaveri Di". A review from The Humming Heart called that "with this song, Tamil music seems to have begun to make the trudge away from vacuous songs masquerading as entertainment and towards message-driven art, albeit with the same visual adventurousness." The New Indian Express chief critic Hymathi M, listed it in one of the few songs that "used by listeners to comfort our mind and soul during pandemic times". Writing for The Wire, Sreenidhi Padmanabhan, a student at Jawaharlal Nehru University with her professor Ajith Kanna, stated that "the song is a remarkable lyrical and musical intervention that takes us one step closer to annihilating caste". Avinash Ramachandran of Cinema Express stated the song in his 'Jukebox 2021' review, adding that it "opened up mainstream Tamil cinema audiences to the idea of music videos as a separate entity".

Records 
The song crossed more than 2 million streams in the music platform Spotify within two weeks. The video which released on 10 March 2021, had crossed more than 20 million views within the span of a week. It became the first non-film Tamil song to cross more than 100 million views (as of April 2021), and 4 million likes becoming the second Tamil song to achieve this feat. It further crossed 200 million views during the end of May 2021, and 270 million views as of June 2021. It was one of the Top 10 music videos from India being played on YouTube.

Chart performance

Weekly charts

Controversies

Rolling Stone cover controversy 
Despite the song's success, its contributor, rapper-cum-lyricist Arivu, was notably not included on the cover of the July 2021 edition of Rolling Stone India magazine, which included singer, Dhee, and rapper, Shan Vincent de Paul, with the latter being the lead performer on "Neeye Oli" for which Arivu contributed lyrics to. Pa. Ranjith criticised the executives of Rolling Stone India and music platform Maajja, for failing to credit the lyricist and interviewing him. Many netizens pointed about Arivu's erasure as a result of caste-based discrimination, since Arivu belonged to a marginalised Dalit household. Shan Vincent also came in support of Arivu, calling out Maajja for his erasure, but criticised Ranjith for creating a rift between the two Tamil rappers. Noel Kirthiraj, the CEO of Maajja, eventually responded that "The cover has nothing to do with the songs Enjoy Enjaami and Neeye Oli, but I understand the confusion as they were promoted along with it. When stories are written about Arivu and there is no mention of Dhee and Santhosh Narayanan, it is absolutely fine. Maajja’s intentions are quite clear and one thing Maajja won’t do is play politics or do something to please people." In response to the controversy, Rolling Stone subsequently released another cover of that magazine, featuring Arivu and other Maajja artists, in August 2021.

Chess Olympiad 
The song was played at the inaugural ceremony of the 44th Chess Olympiad in Chennai, with Dhee and Kidakkuzhi Mariyammal performing. However, Arivu was not featured in the event, and was also not credited in the live performance. On 1 August 2022, Arivu wrote a detailed post on Instagram, saying that he took the sole responsibilities of songwriting, composition and performing the track, and nearly spent six months on the creation of the song. He further said: "... No doubt it’s a great team work. No doubt it calls everyone together. But it does not mean that's not the history of Valliammal or the landless Tea plantation slave ancestors of mine. Every song of mine will be having the scar mark of this generational oppression. Like this just on. There are 10000 songs of folk in this land. The Songs that carry the breath of ancestors, their pain, their life, love, their resistance and all about their existence. It’s all speaking to you in beautiful songs. Because we are a generation of blood and sweat turned into melodies of liberating arts." In response, Santhosh Narayanan stated on Twitter, adding that both Dhee and Arivu involved in the creative process of writing and composing the songs, while he was involved in the music production.

DJ Snake remix 
On the occasion of World Music Day (21 June 2021), global music streaming platform Spotify had collaborated with French DJ & Producer DJ Snake, to recreate this single for the platform's Spotify Singles; an initiative to provide a platform for artists to record and re-record their originals, which was welcomed as an opportunity for musicians to explore global music cultures and work with their counterparts. In order to launch this initiative in India, DJ Snake remixed the song with the original singer Dhee, blending "electronic dance music" with "distinctive styles influenced by the sounds native to Tamil Nadu". Dhee added that she was excited about being the first artist from India to be a part of the Spotify Singles program for her debut independent single, as was Santhosh Narayanan, the song producer. Varun Krishnan of The Indian Express wrote "The song is composed of distinctive styles that work together to create a sound like no other. DJ Snake’s EDM beats are well contrasted with Dhee’s vocals. Dhee delivers her part with much emphasis on rhythm and flow and the song is the personification of what a mashup of contrasting styles should be." This remixed version of the song was displayed in the Times Square Billboard in New York, becoming one of the first Tamil independent single to be showcased here.

Credits 
Credits adapted from Maajja

Video credits 

 Director: Amith Krishnan
 Cinematographer : Balaji Subramanyam
 Choreography: Suren (The Dancers Club)
 Art Director: Siva Sankar
 Costume Designer: Pallavi Singh
 Stylist: Preksha Chordia
 Colourist: Arun Sangameshwar 
 Direction Team: Manojkumar, Ramanathan Sathyamoorthy, Ashik Mohammed, Vishal Ravichandran
 Assistant Cinematographers: Vikram, Chandru, Santhosh, Varun
 Camera Assistant: Vignesh R
 Still Photography: Nirmal Vedhachalam
 Publicity Designs: Gautham J
 Production House: Studio MOCA

Song credits 

 Composed, Arranged and Programmed by: Santhosh Narayanan, Arivu
 Singers: Arivu, Dhee
 Lyricist: Arivu
 Guitars: Keba Jeremiah, Chris Jason, Michael Murray
 Bass: Navien Napier
 Mouth Trumpet: Ganesh Kumar B
 Keys: Maarten Visser
 Harp: Seenu
 Cello: Balaji
 Percussions: RK Sundar
 Sound Engineers: Santhosh Narayanan, RK Sundar (Future Tense Studios), S. Sivakumar, Pradeep Menon, Krishnan Subramanian, Manoj Raman, Aravind MS (AM Studios), Prithvi Chandrashekhar (Krimson Avenue Studios), Sai Shravanam (Resound India)
 Mixed and Mastered by: Santhosh Narayanan (Future Tense Studios), Sai Shravanam (Resound India)
 Additional Studio Mixing: P. A. Deepak (AM Studios)
 Mastered for iTunes by: S. Sivakumar, Riyasdeen Riyan (AM Studios)
 Musicians Co-ordinator: Meenakshi Santhosh

References

External links 

 

 "Enjoy Enjaami" on Spotify

2021 songs
Indian songs
Tamil-language songs
Viral videos
Songs with music by Arivu
Songs with lyrics by Arivu
Dhee songs